Botolan, officially the Municipality of Botolan, is a 1st class municipality in the province of Zambales, Philippines. According to the 2020 census, it has a population of 66,739 people.

The municipality was founded by Spanish Governor-General Juan de Salcedo in 1572.  Botolan is known for its larger Aeta population, wide gray sand beaches, and as the location of Mount Pinatubo.

Etymology
The name Botolan came from the a native variety of banana common in the area called "Boto-an". The word "Boto-an" is a Sambal word which combines the word botol which means "seeds" and the locative prefix -an, referring to a place with many seeded bananas.

Geography
Located just south of the provincial capital of Iba, Botolan has the largest land area of the municipalities in Zambales.

Barangays

Botolan is politically subdivided into 31 barangays.

Climate

Demographics

Economy

Tourism

The barangay of Binoclutan is the "Beach Capital" of Botolan, featuring several first class resorts. The area is a habitat of sea turtles, as is all of the Zambales coastline. Olive Ridley, Green turtles and Hawksbill turtles nest along the beaches of Botolan every year between September and January. A turtle hatchery located is located in Binoklutan. The area also has many other attractions, beach resorts, waterfalls, hiking paths, views of the lahar fields left by the 1991 eruption of Mount Pinatubo, and views of Mount Pinatubo itself.

The Fiesta Poon Bato, held January 23–24, is a religious festival that attracts up to 500,000 devotees. Features include cultural dancing from local Aeta tribes in the town plaza on the first night.

The Domorokdok Festival, held May 3–4, includes street parades, street dancing, a beauty pageant and displays of Botolan products and industries.

Ina Poon Bato
The Ina Poón Bató is a purportedly miraculous, syncretised image of the Blessed Virgin Mary. Legend has it that before the arrival of the Spanish in the area sometime in the 17th century, local Aeta peoples had discovered a carved wooden statue on a large rock that they called Apo Apang ("Little Queen") and began worshipping the image. On the arrival of Recollect missionaries in 1607, the natives associated the statue with the Roman Catholic depictions of the Virgin Mary, and the image was subsequently Christianised as Ina Poón Bato ("Mother of the Lord Rock").

The image was canonically blessed by Pope John Paul II in 1985 at a ceremony in Vatican City. After the 1991 eruption of Mount Pinatubo destroyed the original village, the image (which was found intact and buried chest-deep in lahar) and its shrine were moved to the nearby resettlement area of Loob-Bunga. The feast of Ina Poón Bató is celebrated every late January, with devotees flocking to the original image inside a chapel belonging to the Aglipayan Church, and the 1976 replica enshrined in the Catholic chapel.

Government

Elected officials
Municipal officials (2019-2022)
Mayor: Omar Ebdane
Vice Mayor: Doris Ladines

References

External links

Botolan Profile at PhilAtlas.com
[ Philippine Standard Geographic Code]
Philippine Census Information

Municipalities of Zambales